An intrastate region of Mexico (Spanish: Región) is a collection of municipalities in a Mexican state that are grouped together for statistical purposes. For example, in the State of Mexico, the 125 municipalities are grouped into 20 regions, and are numbered by Roman numerals. The reasons for such a grouping include simplicity of administration and keeping statistics, politics, as well as geographic relationship (such as being part of a particular valley.)
 Regions of Mexico
Geography of Mexico